Calycosin is an O-methylated isoflavone. It can be isolated from Astragalus membranaceus Bge. var. mongholicus and Trifolium pratense L. (red clover).

Biosynthesis 
Isoflavone 3′-hydroxylase uses formononetin, NADPH, H+ and O2 to produce calycosin, NADP+ and H2O.

References 

O-methylated isoflavones